Zeki Önatlı (born 30 October 1967) is a former Turkish footballer and currently coach.

Career

Player
Önatlı had begun playing football in Bursaspor where he spelled 6 seasons at youth level. Joined Bergamaspor, a local team located in western city of İzmir, he spent 2 years at the club and joined then Beşiktaş in 1987, in which he played for 6 seasons and won numerous trophies. In Beşiktaş and Kocaelispor years, he played also at European Cups, having 1 cap in UEFA Champions League once in 1992-93 seasonand Cup Winners' Cup twice in 1997-97 season.

Önatlı played in Turkish national football team in different levels, served the outfit in total of 26 matches, scoring twice at U-18 level.

Coaching
Started his coaching career in Black Sea Region team Çaykur Rizespor along with former team fellow Rıza Çalımbay in 2004, duo joined Beşiktaş a season later in 2005 with Gökhan Keskin, another former team friend, forming the coaching structure. Following the resignation of Çalımbay in week 9 of 2005-06 season, Önatlı remained his job also under management of Jean Tigana until 2007.

Honours
 Beşiktaş
Turkish League: 3 (1989–90, 1990–91, 1991–92, 1994–95)
 Turkish Cup: 2 (1988–89, 1989–90)
 Presidential Cup: 2 (1988-89, 1991–92)
 Chancellor Cup: 1 (1987–88)
 TSYD Cup: 3 (1988, 1990, 1991)
 Kocaelispor
 Turkish Cup: 1 (1996–97)

References

External links
 Footballer profile at TFF
 Coach profile at TFF

1967 births
Living people
Sportspeople from Manisa
Turkish footballers
Turkey international footballers
Turkey under-21 international footballers
Süper Lig players
Beşiktaş J.K. footballers
Kocaelispor footballers
Bursaspor footballers
İstanbulspor footballers
Association football midfielders